Leslie A. Lyons is an associate professor at University of Missouri College of Veterinary Medicine.

Career

In 2002, Lyons made  international headlines by analyzing the DNA of the world's first cloned cat, a kitten named
Cc:, and confirming that it was indeed a true clone, a genetic copy of its mother.

Lyons has helped develop DNA tests for polycystic kidney disease (PKD), an inherited condition that shortens the life of cats by causing them to suffer kidney cysts. Previous tests for this condition involved ultrasound scanning and were not very accurate, unlike the DNA test devised by Lyons. Approximately one third of all Persian cats carried the PKD gene at one time, but because of ultrasound testing and the newer, more accurate DNA tests, these PKD-carrier cats are gradually being identified and removed from the feline gene pool by spaying and neutering.

A DNA test for feline coat color carriers and feline parentage has also been developed by Lyons, and is being offered to cat breeders, like the PKD test, so that they can determine whether cats they have bred have correct pedigrees, and whether these cats carry colorpoints, Burmese Colour Restriction, long hair, colour dilution or rare coat colors, such as chocolate and cinnamon.

One of Lyons' current projects is identification of the genes that cause head defect, a lethal deformity in American Burmese cats. She is also working on identifying genes that cause Progressive Retinal Atrophy (PRA), which causes affected kittens to become blind at the age of approximately two months.

Although much of Lyons' research has dealt with cats, she also works on resources for gene mapping of other companion animals, such as dogs and horses. She has a partial appointment with the California National Primate Research Center and is developing new genetic research for the rhesus macaque.

References

1. 
2. Lyons' Den Homepage at http://felinegenetics.missouri.edu/

Year of birth missing (living people)
Living people
University of California, Davis faculty
American geneticists